Formartine United Football Club are a Scottish senior association football club from Pitmedden, Aberdeenshire currently playing in the Highland Football League. They joined the Highland League for the 2009–10 season, having been accepted into the League on 25 February 2009.

History

Formartine United were formed in 1948. Formartine is actually a committee area in Aberdeenshire, the district extending north from the River Don to the River Ythan. The club are based in Pitmedden, a small rural village in Aberdeenshire which lies fourteen miles north of Aberdeen. The original village club was known as Pitmedden and the reasons behind the choice of name for the new club have never been clear. The club were admitted to a newly expanded Highland League in 2009. In 2013 the club won the much-coveted Aberdeenshire Cup, their first success at senior level. Prior to this the club won the North of Scotland Amateur Cup once and the North Regional Cup once. The club has three times been runner-up in the Highland League - in 2012–13, 2015–16 and 2017–18.
They hold the record for the most goals scored in a Highland League season with 137 in 2015–16.

Stadium

Formartine United plays its home games at North Lodge Park, Pitmedden. The stadium has a maximum capacity of 1,800 spectators.

Current squad

Senior honours
Highland League Cup:
Winners: 2017–18

Aberdeenshire Cup:
Winners: 2013–14, 2017–18

Aberdeenshire Shield:
Winners: 2018–19

Aberdeenshire League:
Winners: 2015–16

Junior honours
North Region Premier Division winners: 2001–02
North Regional (North) League winners: 1968–69
North Region Premier Division Cup winners: 2005–06
North East League Cup winners: 1998–99
Archibald Cup winners: 1998–99
McLeman Cup winners: 1998–99
Duthie Cup winners: 1967–68, 2000–01, 2001–02
Aberdeen Cable TV Cup winners: 1998–99
North Drybrough Cup winners: 1971–72
Morrison Trophy winners: 1978–79

References

External links
 Official website
 Facebook
 Twitter

Football clubs in Scotland
Highland Football League teams
Scottish Junior Football Association clubs
Association football clubs established in 1948
1948 establishments in Scotland
Football in Aberdeenshire
Formartine United F.C.